"Happy Birthday" is a single by Flipsyde from their album We the People, released on December 27, 2005. The track's theme is a man apologizing for his involvement in an abortion, and features samples of "Gomenasai" by t.A.T.u., including their vocals on backup.

Track listing
 "Happy Birthday" (feat. Piper) — 3:15
 "Peace" (feat. Piper & Black Albert) — 2:59
 "Shaka" (feat. Piper) — 5:35
 "Happy Birthday" (Multimedia Track)

Chart positions

Weekly charts

Year-end charts

Certifications

References

2006 singles
Flipsyde songs
Songs about abortion
Interscope Records singles